The following tables compare general and technical information among a number of digital audio editors and multitrack recording software.

Digital Audio Workstations 

Basic general information about the software: creator/company, license/price etc.

Wave editors 

Basic general information about the software: creator/company, license/price etc.

Support

Plugin support 
The plugin types the software can run natively (without emulation).

File format support 
The various file types the software can read/write.

Notes

See also
 List of music software

Notes

Audio engineering
 
Audio editors
Sound recording